Pasado ("Past") is the fourth studio album from Sin Bandera. The album is composed of covers from artists who influenced the duo's musical upbringing. It was released on November 14, 2006.

Track listing

Sales and certifications

References

2006 albums
Sin Bandera albums